Jefferson Township is one of fifteen townships in Greene County, Indiana, USA.  As of the 2010 census, its population was 2,094.

Geography
The streams of Bunnell Branch, Corbin Creek, Eel River and Lemon Creek run through this township.

Cities and towns
 Worthington

Unincorporated towns
 Johnstown
 Point Commerce
 Rincon
(This list is based on USGS data and may include former settlements.)

Adjacent townships
 Jefferson Township, Owen County (north)
 Franklin Township, Owen County (northeast)
 Highland Township (east)
 Richland Township (southeast)
 Fairplay Township (south)
 Smith Township (west)

Cemeteries
The township contains eight cemeteries: Barton, Bullerman, Dixon, Griffith, Hayes, Oak Grove, Stanley and Steward.

Major highways

Education
Jefferson Township residents may obtain a library card from the Worthington-Jefferson Township Public Library in Worthington.

References
 
 United States Census Bureau cartographic boundary files

External links
 Indiana Township Association
 United Township Association of Indiana

Townships in Greene County, Indiana
Bloomington metropolitan area, Indiana
Townships in Indiana